Woodmere may refer to some place names in the United States:

Woodmere, Baltimore, Maryland, a neighborhood
Woodmere, Montgomery, Alabama, a neighborhood
Woodmere, Louisiana
Woodmere, New York
Woodmere (LIRR station)
Woodmere, Ohio
Woodmere Art Museum, Philadelphia, Pennsylvania
Woodmere Cemetery, Detroit, Michigan